Jamie Daniel Burns (born 6 March 1984 in Blackpool, Lancashire) is an English professional footballer who played in midfield for Morecambe, whom he joined from Blackpool on 1 July 2007. He had been on loan from his hometown club since November 2006. At Blackpool, Burns scored four goals with strikes against Boreham Wood in the FA Cup, MK Dons in the league and a brace against Huddersfield Town in the Football League Trophy. After making his move to Morecambe permanent he scored once for the club in a 1–0 win over Tranmere Rovers in the Football League Trophy.

References

External links
 

Living people
1984 births
Sportspeople from Blackpool
English footballers
Blackpool F.C. players
Bury F.C. players
Morecambe F.C. players
Association football midfielders